Neil Ellis (born 30 April 1969) is a former professional footballer who played in The Football League for Maidstone United and Chester City.

Ellis left Bangor City for Chester City in the summer of 1990, while the club was playing at Macclesfield Town's ground. A year later he joined Maidstone United, and was still with the club when it folded in the summer of 1992. This led him to move to the Sing Tao Club in Hong Kong. He spent a couple of years in Hong Kong, which included a spell in the newly formed Chinese professional league with Guangdong. Ellis also played professionally in Belgium and Malaysia before moving to Ohio in the US, where he became a player/coach. He later played for several English non-league clubs, including Kettering Town and Northwich Victoria.

References

English footballers
Chester City F.C. players
Kettering Town F.C. players
Bangor City F.C. players
Northwich Victoria F.C. players
Maidstone United F.C. (1897) players
English Football League players
National League (English football) players
1969 births
Living people
Association football forwards
Association football midfielders